Peeter Koemets (13 January 1868 Vana-Antsla Parish, Võru County – 1950 Omsk Oblast, Russia) was an Estonian Lutheran clergyman and politician. He was a member of I Riigikogu and former Mayor of Vana-Antsla Parish. His younger brother was politician Kael Koemets.

References

1868 births
1950 deaths
Estonian Lutheran clergy
Members of the Riigikogu, 1920–1923
Mayors of places in Estonia
Estonian prisoners and detainees
People who died in the Gulag
Estonian people who died in Soviet detention
People from Antsla Parish